Peng Weijun (born February 23, 1973) is a retired Chinese football player who is the younger brother of former Chinese international Peng Weiguo. In his career, he played for Happy Valley, Guangzhou Apollo, Shenzhen Jinpeng, Qingdao Jonoon and Shenyang Ginde before he retired, where he has since become a businessman.

Background
Peng Weijun is of Hakka ethnicity and his father originates from Jiexi, Guangdong.

Club career
Peng Weijun would follow in his older brothers footsteps Peng Weiguo and started his career with top tier side Guangzhou Apollo. While his brother established himself as vital member of the team Peng Weijun would only be a squad player and moved to second tier football club Shenzhen Jinpeng to gain more playing time in 1996. He would then be part of the squad that moved to Yunnan as the club changed their name to Yunnan Hongta before he had the chance to join another top tier side in Qingdao Jonoon where in the 2000 league season he scored the fastest goal in Chinese football history against his old club Yunnan Hongta.

International career
He was a member of China Olympic National Team 1994–1995.

References

External links
Player profile at sodasoccer.com

1973 births
Living people
Chinese footballers
Footballers from Guangzhou
Hakka sportspeople
People from Jiexi
Businesspeople from Guangzhou
Guangzhou F.C. players
Qingdao Hainiu F.C. (1990) players
Changsha Ginde players
Happy Valley AA players
Hong Kong First Division League players
Association football midfielders